Plymouth Congregational Church is located on East Onondaga Street in Syracuse, New York.  It was designed in 1858 by Horatio Nelson White in the Romanesque Revival style.  The founding congregation was closely associated with the abolitionist movement in Syracuse.  It was listed on the National Register of Historic Places in 1997.

References

External links

Churches completed in 1858
Churches in Syracuse, New York
National Register of Historic Places in Syracuse, New York
Churches on the National Register of Historic Places in New York (state)
Georgian architecture in New York (state)